Missouri hosts a number of sports teams. Missouri is home to six major league professional sports teams — three in the St. Louis metropolitan area, and three in the Kansas City metropolitan area.

Missouri hosted the 1904 Summer Olympics at Washington University in St. Louis, the first time the games were hosted in the United States.

Major league sports teams

* — Team represents a location in the state but plays its home games outside the state boundaries.

Teams in other top-level leagues 

* — Team represents a location in the state but plays its home games outside the state boundaries.

Minor leagues

Former teams

Teams which are no longer in Missouri

Defunct

College sports

There are six NCAA Division I teams in the state, one of which started a transition from NCAA Division II in July 2022. The only D-I program in the Football Bowl Subdivision is the Missouri Tigers. As of the 2022–23 school year, 13 schools play in NCAA Division II, with eight in the Great Lakes Valley Conference and five in the Mid-America Intercollegiate Athletics Association.

See also
 Sports in Kansas City
 Sports in St. Louis
 Soccer in St. Louis

References